Khafr County is in Fars province, Iran. The capital of the county is the city of Bab Anar. At the 2006 census, the county's population (as Khafr District of Jahrom County) was 42,199 in 10,550 households. The following census in 2011 counted 40,535 people in 11,860 households. At the 2016 census, the district's population was 42,263 in 13,590 households. The district was separated from Jahrom County in 2019 and became Khafr County.

Administrative divisions

The population history of Khafr County's administrative divisions (as Khafr District of Jahrom Couty) over three consecutive censuses is shown in the following table.

References

 

Counties of Fars Province